Monocesta is a genus of skeletonizing leaf beetles and flea beetles in the family Chrysomelidae. There are at least three described species in Monocesta.

Species
These three species belong to the genus Monocesta:
 Monocesta coryli (Say, 1824) i c g b (larger elm leaf beetle)
 Monocesta equestris Clark, 1865 g
 Monocesta illustris Clark, 1865 g
Data sources: i = ITIS, c = Catalogue of Life, g = GBIF, b = Bugguide.net

References

Further reading

External links

 

Galerucinae
Chrysomelidae genera
Articles created by Qbugbot
Taxa named by Hamlet Clark